Cochylimorpha cultana is a species of moth of the family Tortricidae. It is found in China (Gansu, Jilin, Ningxia, Qinghai, Shaanxi, Shandong, Shanxi), Russia and Europe (Portugal, Spain, France, Bulgaria and Romania).

The wingspan is 13–17 mm. Adults are on wing from May to June.

The larvae feed on Artemisia campestris. The feeding results in a fusiform swelling on the lateral branches of their host plant.

References

Moths described in 1855
Cochylimorpha
Moths of Europe
Moths of Asia